Asterivora chatuidea is a moth of the family Choreutidae. It is endemic to New Zealand and has been collected in and around Dunedin. The larvae of this species are leaf miners and hosts include Helichrysum lanceolatum, Olearia quinquevulnera and Pseudognaphalium luteoalbum. Adults of this species has been recorded as being on the wing in November, January and February.

Taxonomy 
This species was first described by Charles E. Clarke in 1926 using 12 specimens collected in November at Vauxhall, Andersons Bay in Dunedin. Clarke originally named the species Simaethis chatuidea. In 1979 J. S. Dugdale placed this species within the genus Asterivora. In 1988 Dugdale confirmed this placement. The male holotype specimen, as well as other specimens using in the naming of this species, are held at the Auckland War Memorial Museum.

Description 
The wingspan is about 8 mm for males and 9 mm for females. The head and thorax are dark fuscous irrorated with violet-whitish scales and the antennae are blackish annulated with white. The abdomen is dark fuscous, although the segmental margins are white and there are a few scattered white scales near the extremity. The legs are fuscous. The dark blue-violet forewings are suboblong, moderate, the costa gently arched, the apex obtuse, the termen nearly straight and oblique. There are three distinct white spots on the costa and there is a pale blue-violet transverse line, as well as some violet-white irroration towards the base. There is also a transverse, sometimes double, line running from the first white spot on the costa and another running from the central costal spot. This line is broken but often well angulated at the middle. There is some violet-white irroration scattered across the outer wing and a fine subterminal line. The hindwings are dark fuscous, but darker outwardly. There is an incurved white streak, sometimes double, running from the disc to the tornus.

Distribution 
This species is endemic to New Zealand. It has been collected in and around Dunedin.

Behaviour 
The adults of this species is on the wing in November, January and February.

Hosts 

The larvae of A. chatuidea are leaf miners and form distinctive damage on their host plants. These include Helichrysum lanceolatum, Olearia quinquevulnera and Pseudognaphalium luteoalbum.

References

External links

Species of New Zealand Lepidoptera

Asterivora
Moths of New Zealand
Endemic fauna of New Zealand
Moths described in 1926
Taxa named by Charles Edwin Clarke
Endemic moths of New Zealand